Scotland on Sunday is a Scottish Sunday newspaper, published in Edinburgh by JPIMedia and consequently assuming the role of Sunday sister to its daily stablemate The Scotsman. It was originally printed in broadsheet format but in 2013 was relaunched as a tabloid.  Since this latest relaunch it comprises three parts, the newspaper itself which includes the original "Insight" section, a sports section and Spectrum magazine which incorporates At Home, originally a separate magazine.

It backed a 'No' vote in the referendum on Scottish independence.

History
Scotland on Sunday was launched on 7 August 1988 and was priced at 40p.

Ultimate ownership of Scotland on Sunday has changed several times since launch. The Scotsman Publications Limited, which also produces The Scotsman, Edinburgh Evening News and the Herald & Post series of free newspapers in Edinburgh, Fife, West Lothian and Perth, was bought by the Canadian millionaire Roy Thomson in 1953.

In 1995, the group was sold to the billionaire Barclay Brothers for £85 million. They moved the group from its landmark Edinburgh office on North Bridge, which is now an upmarket hotel, to new offices in Holyrood Road, near where the Scottish Parliament Building was subsequently built. Then in December 2005 the paper, along with the other Scotsman Publications titles, was sold to Edinburgh-based newspaper group Johnston Press in a £160 million deal. Johnston Press entered administration in November 2018. Its assets were acquired by JPIMedia.

Christmas Edition
As that Christmas day is falling on Sunday in 2022 instead or normal there will be "Scotland On Christmas" published on Saturday December 24th Christmas Eve.

See also
List of newspapers in Scotland
Iain Gale, Scotland on Sunday art critic
Andrew Crumey, Scotland on Sunday literary editor, 2000–06

References

Newspapers published in Scotland
Mass media in Edinburgh
Newspapers with Scottish Gaelic content
Scottish brands
Publications established in 1988
1988 establishments in Scotland
The Scotsman
Newspapers published by Johnston Press